Marechal Cunha Machado International Airport , formerly called Tirirical Airport, is the airport serving São Luís, Brazil. Since 17 October 1985 the airport is named after Marechal Cunha Machado.

It is operated by CCR.

History
In 1942, a grass track measuring one thousand meters (runway 09/27), which served the airbase of the Brazilian Army, was the only way that São Luís had to receive flights. Runway 06/24 was built as part of the US base which began operating in 1943. In 1974, the Air Ministry transferred to Infraero technical jurisdiction, administrative and operational airport. The new terminal of the airport Marechal Cunha Machado was opened in June 1998. The name of the airport is a tribute to the Air Marshall and Captain Lieutenant Commander Hugo da Cunha Machado, born in Maranhão. In October 2004 it was upgraded to international category.

Previously operated by Infraero, on April 7, 2021 CCR won a 30-year concession to operate the airport.

Airlines and destinations

Passenger

Cargo

Accidents and incidents
1 June 1973: a Cruzeiro do Sul Sud Aviation SE-210 Caravelle VI N registration PP-PDX operating flight 109 from Belém-Val de Cans to São Luís crashed on approach to São Luís. Engine no.1 lost power and the aircraft attained an extreme nose-up attitude. It stalled and crashed 760m to the right of the runway. All 23 passengers and crew died.
3 February 1984: a Cruzeiro do Sul Airbus A300B4-203 operating flight 302 en route from São Luís to Belém-Val de Cans with 176 passengers and crew aboard was hijacked by 3 persons who demanded to be taken to Cuba. The flight reached Camagüey in less than a day. There were no victims.

Access

See also
List of airports in Brazil

References

External links

Airports in Maranhão
São Luís, Maranhão
Airports established in 1942
1942 establishments in Brazil